Theobald Butler, 3rd Chief Butler of Ireland (1224 – 26 December 1248) was 6 years old when his father, Theobald died. His mother was Joan de Marisco, daughter of the Justiciar of Ireland, Geoffrey de Marisco.
Like his infamous father-in-law, Theobald was created Justiciar of Ireland in 1247. He supported King Henry III in his wars with his barons. He was buried beside his father at Arklow.

Marriage and Children
He married Margery de Burgh, in 1242, daughter of Justiciar of Ireland Richard Mór de Burgh, 1st Lord of Connacht. With his wife he had, besides other lands, the manors of Ardmaile and Killmorarkill. Their children were:   
 Theobald Butler, 4th Chief Butler of Ireland 
 Edmond Butler (d.1321)
 Joanna Butler (1244-1301)
 William Butler (1248-1306) he marries and has four surviving children

See also
Butler dynasty

References 

Ormond, Duke of, Life 1610-'88: Thomas A. Carte, M.A. 6 vols. Oxford, 1851

13th-century Irish people
Theobald
Justiciars of Ireland
People from County Tipperary
People from County Wicklow
Nobility from County Limerick
Normans in Ireland
1224 births

Year of birth uncertain

1248 deaths

Burials at the Abbey of Arklow